The 1973 Macdonald Lassies Championship, the Canadian women's curling championship was held February 26 to March 2 at the Charlottetown Curling Club in Charlottetown, Prince Edward Island.

Manitoba and Saskatchewan both finished round robin play tied for first with 8–1 records, necessitating a tiebreaker playoff between the two teams. Team Saskatchewan, who was skipped by Vera Pezer defeated Manitoba in the tiebreaker 6–4 to capture the championship. It was the fifth straight title for Saskatchewan, and third straight for the Pezer rink.  After the win, the team decided to retire from competitive curling.

Teams
The teams were as follows

Round Robin Standings
Final round robin standings

Tiebreaker
The tiebreaker playoff game for the championship was held in the morning of March 2.

References

Scotties Tournament of Hearts
Macdonald Lassies
Curling competitions in Charlottetown
1973 in Prince Edward Island
February 1973 sports events in North America
March 1973 sports events in Canada